Gornje Dobravice is a settlement west of the town of Metlika in the White Carniola area of southeastern Slovenia. The entire area is part of the traditional region of Lower Carniola and is now included in the Southeast Slovenia Statistical Region.

The local church is dedicated to the Virgin Mary and belongs to the Parish of Podzemelj. It is a small building with a rounded apse, built in 1889 on the site of an earlier chapel.

References

External links
Gornje Dobravice on Geopedia

Populated places in the Municipality of Metlika